Salinas v. United States could refer to the following opinions of the Supreme Court of the United States:

Salinas v. United States, 522 U.S. 52 (1997)
Salinas v. United States, 547 U.S. 188 (2006) (per curiam)